"Sexy to Me" is a song recorded by American singer JoJo. It was written by JoJo, James Washington, Marcella Araica, Kenna and Nathaniel "Danja" Hills, who also produced the song.

Background and composition
"Sexy to Me" was written by Marcella Araica, Nathaniel Hills, Joanna Levesque, James Washington and Kenna Zemedkun, with the production helmed by Danja.

In an interview with Idolator she described something about the lyrical references to Michael Jackson: "I had posters of him in my room. He’s incredible. I used to watch his tour DVDs. I think Dangerous was my favorite album of his at the time, and I loved his HiStory double-CD. I was fascinated by him. I mean, for an artist to say that they weren’t inspired by Michael Jackson — what’s wrong with you? He set the precedent." Levesque describes the song as "It's just a sassy record that's empowering and there's this confidence to it." It is currently being used for the PerfectaWash campaign for Clearasil as JoJo is the spokesperson. The song has been described as a club track with a heavy bass and "squealing, dissonant synths." It plays over a grinding beat and the lyrics feature themes of self-empowerment and female autonomy, present in the lyrics "I don't need nobody cause I'm sexy to me, you keep doing you tonight, cause I'm doing me." Nearly the last forty seconds, the song ends with a wash of synths.

Critical reception
Sam Lansky of MTV Buzzworthy praised "Sexy to Me" for its production and lyrics, describing it as a "major banger". Robbie Daw of Idolator writes " 'Sexy To Me' is a throbbing jam that lives up to its title, but for us the true sexiness arrives with the wash of synths during the last 40 seconds or so." Writers at RapUp.com praised the song as a "confident club-ready cut", writing "JoJo gets her swagger back on the Danja-produced "Sexy to Me". RyanSeacrest.com wrote that "this new club track will make you want to get up out of your seats and drop a few moves!"

Release history

References

2012 singles
Songs written by Danja (record producer)
Song recordings produced by Danja (record producer)
JoJo (singer) songs
Songs written by Marcella Araica
Songs written by Jim Beanz
2012 songs
Blackground Records singles
Songs written by JoJo (singer)